Pinaka may refer to:
 Pinaka (Hinduism) or Shiva Dhanusha, the bow of the Hindu god Shiva
 Pinaka vina, the musical instrument named after Shiva's bow
 Pinaka Multi Barrel Rocket Launcher, a rocket system used by the Indian army
 Pinaka, Corduene, Kurdish Finik